Homeland was a non-parliamentary political party in Slovakia.

Party's names 
 : TODAY
 : Civic Party TODAY (DNES)
 : Civic Left Party (SOĽ)
 From : HOMELAND

History 
As a juridical person, it was registered by the Ministry of the Interior of the Slovak Republic on 28 November 2011, under no. OVVS 3-2011 / 029917 and obtained the identification number of the organization 42257344. During its existence, there were three amendments to the Articles of Association (13 December 2011, 27 September 2013, 24 June 2019) and four changes to the statutory body (8 December 2011, 11 July 2012, August 11, 2017, October 3, 2019), with the general manager of the party, Ing. Anna Žatková.

At a press conference on October 1, 2019, former Minister of Justice (nominee of Mečiar's People's Party – Movement for a Democratic Slovakia) and Supreme Court Judge Štefan Harabin, a failed candidate in the 2019 presidential election, announced that he would run in the 2020 parliamentary election as leader of the political party Homeland.  Possible cooperation was with the Slovak National Party, Smer-SD and probably also We Are Family.

Some members or candidates of the party 

 Štefan Harabin
 Roman Michelko
 Anna Žatkova
 Igor Čombor

Election results 
The party did not participate in the parliamentary elections held during its operation (2012, 2016; EP 2019), with the exception of the 2014 European Parliament election. The party received 1,311 votes (0.23%) and no mandate.

Jediné regionálne voľby, do ktorých sa zapojila, boli voľby do VÚC v roku 2017. Strana postavila 15 kandidátov na poslancov v Prešovskom kraji, ani jeden nebol zvolený.

See also
 List of political parties in Slovakia

References

External links 

 Oficiálne webové sídlo

Nationalist parties in Slovakia
Conservative parties in Slovakia
Politics of Slovakia